California State University, Fresno has numerous notable alumni, faculty, and presidents.

Notable alumni 

Armen A. Alchian – Professor Emeritus, founder of the "UCLA Tradition" in Economics
Marvin Baxter – Justice, California Supreme Court
Todd Beamer – victim of the September 11 attacks (passenger aboard United Airlines Flight 93)
Robert Beltran – actor, Star Trek
Lee P. Brown – former Mayor of Houston, former New York Police Commissioner
Cruz Bustamante – California Lieutenant Governor
Daniel Chacón – university professor, acclaimed essayist, playwright, and fiction writer
John Christy - director of the Earth System Science Center at the University of Alabama in Huntsville
Noreen Corcoran – actress
Jim Costa – U.S. Representative, former California State Assembly Member
Dr. Joseph Crowley – President Emeritus, University of Nevada
Dr. Ed Diener – professor and psychologist studying subjective well-being
Dr. Janice Emerzian - National ADA Consultant in Higher Education and Persons with Disabilities
William Everson – poet (did not graduate)
Geoffrey Gamble – President, Montana State University
Kenny Guinn – Governor of Nevada
John Harlan - Game show announcer
Brandi Hitt - Los Angeles based news anchor
Rick Husband – mission commander, shuttle Columbia, STS-107, 2003
Raymond Ibrahim – Coptic-American author and commentator
Robert A. Jensen – an American writer and crisis management expert
Bill Jones – former California Secretary of State
Dot Marie Jones – actress
Emily Kuroda – actress
Brad Lewis – producer of Ratatouille
Janet Nichols Lynch – author 
Mike Martz – former NFL head coach, St. Louis Rams, current offensive coordinator for the Chicago Bears
Ronald Markarian Major General of the United States Air Force and the California State Director of the U.S. Selective Service System
Manny Mashouf – Chairman and Chief Executive Officer, bebe stores
Steven Nagel – NASA astronaut
Thomas Nixon – author
Joe Odagiri – Japanese actor
Paul O'Neill – former U.S. Secretary of the Treasury, CEO of Alcoa Corporation
Sam Peckinpah – film director
Charles Poochigian – California State Senator
Lyle Setencich – former Boise State Broncos head football coach, former Texas Tech Red Raiders football defensive coordinator
Daniel Silva – author
Gary Soto – poet, essayist, and fiction writer
Joyce Sumbi – Librarian in the Los Angeles County Library system 
Sherley Anne Williams – author, National Book Award nominee, Emmy Award winner
Brett Young – country music artist

Notable athletes 
Stephen Abas – Olympic silver medalist, freestyle wrestling (2004); three-time NCAA champion
Davante Adams – wide receiver for the Las Vegas Raiders
Courtney Alexander – former NBA player
Rafer Alston – former NBA point guard, And1/New York City streetball legend Skip to my Lou
Jahine Arnold – former NFL wide receiver
Stephen Baker – former NFL wide receiver
Desi Barmore - American-Israeli basketball player
Laura Berg – three-time Olympic gold-medalist, USA Softball
Bernard Berrian – former NFL wide receiver, Minnesota Vikings; played in Super Bowl XLI with the Chicago Bears
Sonny Bishop – former AFL offensive lineman
Reggie Brown – former NFL fullback
David Carr – former NFL quarterback, 1st overall draft pick in the 2002 NFL Draft by the Houston Texans
Derek Carr – Oakland Raiders quarterback 
Duane Carter – former Indianapolis 500 racer
 Haley Cavinder – former Bulldogs women's basketball player; also a notable internet personality. Transferred to the University of Miami in 2022.
Ron Cox – former NFL linebacker (Chicago Bears, Green Bay Packers), NCAA sacks leader
Aaron Craver – former NFL fullback
Tyrone Culver – former NFL safety, Green Bay Packers
Trent Dilfer –  former NFL quarterback and Super Bowl-champion quarterback as member of the Baltimore Ravens
Pat Doyle – baseball coach
Henry Ellard – former NFL wide receiver 
Melvin Ely – former NBA forward-center, two-time WAC Player of the Year (2001–2002)
John Erickson – Canadian PGA Tour Winner, 1991 Windsor Charity Classic, 1985 PCAA Conference Champion (FSU 1981–1986)
Noel Felix – former NBA player, NBDL player, Anaheim Arsenal
Doug Fister – former MLB pitcher 
Vernon Fox – former NFL safety, Denver Broncos
Jethro Franklin – NFL assistant coach, Houston Texans, former NFL player
Hiram Fuller – former NBA player
Mark Gardner – former MLB pitcher, current bullpen coach, San Francisco Giants
Augie Garrido – University of Texas baseball coach
Matt Garza – former MLB pitcher
A. J. Gass – former CFL linebacker
Paul George – NBA player, Los Angeles Clippers
Dan Gladden – former MLB outfielder 
Tom Goodwin – former MLB outfielder, former NCAA steals leader
Nate Grimes (born 1996) - basketball player in the Israeli Basketball Premier League
Cory Hall – former NFL safety
Brandon Halsey – wrestler; professional mixed martial artist
Jamey Harris – 1998 USA track & field national champion in men's 1500 meter and sub-4 minute miler
Gary Hayes – former NFL defensive back
Chris Herren – former NBA player
Rod Higgins – General Manager, Golden State Warriors
Orlando Huff – former NFL linebacker
Ervin Hunt – former NFL defensive back
Chris Jefferies – former NBA player, Argentine national league player, Club Sportivo Ben Hur
Adam Jennings – former NFL wide receiver, Detroit Lions
Tyler Johnson – NBA player, Miami Heat
Bobby Jones – former MLB pitcher, 1991 NCAA Player of the Year
Charlie Jones – former NFL wide receiver
Tommy Jones – former gridiron football player
Aaron Judge – MLB outfielder, New York Yankees
Lane Kiffin –current head football coach at The University of Mississippi, former Tennessee Volunteers head coach, former Oakland Raiders head coach, former USC head coach and assistant coach, former Fresno State quarterback 
Herman A. Lawson, highly decorated U.S. Army Air Force/U.S. Air Force officer, combat fighter pilot with the Tuskegee Airmen, and former Sacramento, California City Councilman. First African American to play football all four years at Fresno.
Louis Leonard – former NFL defensive tackle, Cleveland Browns
Tito Maddox – former NBA player
Logan Mankins – former NFL offensive lineman, New England Patriots (first-round draft pick 2005)
Dante Marsh – former CFL cornerback, BC Lions
Richard Marshall – NFL cornerback, Carolina Panthers
Mike Martz – offensive coordinator of the Chicago Bears
Ryan Mathews – 2010 NFL Draft, first-round selection, 12th overall pick, NFL running back, Philadelphia Eagles
Marcus McCauley – former NFL cornerback, Minnesota Vikings
Casey McGehee – MLB third and first baseman, currently of the San Francisco Giants 
Dominic McGuire – NBA player, Charlotte Bobcats
Garrett McIntyre – former NFL linebacker
Mike Moffitt – former NFL tight end
Lorenzo Neal – former NFL fullback, three-time Pro Bowler
Tom Neville – former NFL guard
Damacio Page – Bulldog wrestler; professional mixed martial artist, formerly for the WEC and the UFC
Stephone Paige – former NFL wide receiver
Terry Pendleton – former MLB third baseman, 1991 National League MVP Atlanta Braves
Michael Pittman – former NFL running back, currently with Florida Tuskers of the UFL
Marquez Pope – former NFL defensive back
Ron Rivers – former NFL running back
Terrance Roberson – former Euroleague basketball player
Bryan Robinson – NFL defensive end, Cincinnati Bengals
James Sanders – NFL safety, New England Patriots
Shanon Slack – former Bulldog wrestler, current mixed martial artist fighting for Bellator
Stephen Spach – NFL tight end, Arizona Cardinals
Michael Stewart – former NFL safety
Omar Stoutmire – former NFL safety
Kevin Sutherland – PGA Tour golfer, won 2002 WGC-Accenture Match Play Championship
Kevin Sweeney – former NCAA record-setter in career passing yards and former NFL quarterback 
Jerry Tarkanian – legendary, controversial basketball coach (Fresno State, UNLV, San Antonio Spurs), won NCAA basketball title as head coach at UNLV
Jeff Tedford – offensive coordinator, Tampa Bay Buccaneers
Lavale Thomas – former NFL running back
Billy Volek – former NFL quarterback, San Diego Chargers
Steve Wapnick - former Major League Baseball pitcher
Derrick Ward – former NFL running back, Tampa Bay Buccaneers 
Taylor Ward - MLB outfielder, Los Angeles Angels
Cornelius Warmerdam – former pole vault world record holder
Anthony Washington – former NFL cornerback
Charles Washington – NFL safety
Tim Washington – former NFL defensive back
Nick Watney – PGA Tour golfer, NCAA All-American, and 2007 Zurich New Orleans champion
Jeff Weaver – former MLB pitcher
Chastin West – former NFL wide receiver, Green Bay Packers
James Williams – former NFL defensive back
Jimy Williams – former manager of three Major League Baseball teams
Paul Williams – former NFL wide receiver, Tennessee Titans
Sam Williams – former NFL linebacker, Oakland Raiders
Justin Wilson - MLB pitcher
Tydus Winans – former NFL wide receiver
Cameron Worrell – former NFL safety
Dwayne Wright – former NFL running back
Rodney Bernard Wright, Jr. – former Arena Football League wide receiver, currently on San Francisco 49ers practice squad
 Austin Wynns - baseball catcher for the San Francisco Giants

Notable faculty and staff 
Lillian Faderman, MFA — English professor emeritus, acclaimed author
Victor Davis Hanson – founder of Classics Department; historian, essayist, columnist and television personality; author of Mexifornia and Carnage and Culture
Juan Felipe Herrera, Chicano and Latin American Studies — current creative writing professor at University of California, Riverside; Poet Laureate of the United States
W. Hudson Kensel – historian of the American West
Philip Levine, English — widely known poet and Pulitzer Prize winner, former Poet Laureate of the United States(deceased)
Roger Mahony, social work — Roman Catholic Cardinal and Archbishop of Los Angeles
Roger Tatarian, journalism — Editor-in-Chief, United Press International (deceased)
Juan Serrano, head of guitar department — flamenco guitarist, helped to form guitar program

References 

List
Fresno people